Eric Diehl is an American former freestyle swimmer of the 1990s.

Diehl grew up in Fort Worth, Texas, and is of Luxembourgian descent. At the age of 15, he moved with his mother to Mission Viejo, California for training purposes and he completed his schooling at Mission Viejo High.

In 1990, Diehl earned a place on the U.S. team for the Goodwill Games after winning the 1,000 m freestyle at the short course national championships. He came eighth in the 800 m freestyle at the Goodwill Games, held in Seattle.

Diehl was the 200 m freestyle gold medalist at the 1991 Pan American Games in Havana, setting a games record. He also took bronze in the 400 m freestyle and swam on the gold medal-winning  relay team.

While attending Stanford University, Diehl competed in varsity swimming for the Cardinal.

References

Year of birth missing (living people)
Living people
American male freestyle swimmers
Swimmers from Texas
Sportspeople from Fort Worth, Texas
Stanford Cardinal men's swimmers
Mission Viejo High School alumni
American people of Luxembourgian descent
Pan American Games medalists in swimming
Pan American Games gold medalists for the United States
Pan American Games bronze medalists for the United States
Medalists at the 1991 Pan American Games
Swimmers at the 1991 Pan American Games
Competitors at the 1990 Goodwill Games